Eidselva lies in Nome municipality in Vestfold og Telemark County, Norway. It rises in Flåvatn, and runs into Norsjø in Ulefoss. The river is part of Skiensvassdraget, and an important part of the Telemark Canal. In the river, there are four hydroelectric power stations: Eidsfoss, Vrangfoss, Ulefoss and Aall-Ulefoss.

References

External links
The Telemark Canal

Rivers of Vestfold og Telemark